The SS William G. Mather (Official Number 224850) is a retired Great Lakes bulk freighter now restored as a museum ship in Cleveland, Ohio, one of five in the Great Lakes region. She transported cargo such as ore, coal, stone, and grain to ports throughout the Great Lakes, and was nicknamed "The Ship That Built Cleveland" because Cleveland's steel mills were a frequent destination.

History
It was built in 1925 by Great Lakes Engineering Works, Ecorse, Michigan, as the flagship for Cleveland-Cliffs and was named in honor of the then-company president, William Gwinn Mather. SS William G. Mather remained the Cliffs' flagship until SS Edward B. Greene (now MV Kaye E. Barker of the Interlake Steamship Company fleet) was built in 1951–52. It remained an active part of the Cliffs' fleet until the end of the 1980 navigation season.

In order to supply the Allied Forces need for steel during World War II, SS William G. Mather led a convoy of 13 freighters in early 1941 through the ice-choked Upper Great Lakes to Duluth, Minnesota, setting a record for the first arrival in a northern port. This effort was featured in the April 28, 1941 issue of Life. It was one of the first commercial Great Lakes vessels to be equipped with radar in 1946. In 1964, it became the very first American vessel to have an automated boiler system, manufactured by Bailey Controls of Cleveland, Ohio.

In 1985, Cleveland-Cliffs sold its two remaining operating steamers to Rouge Steel Company, and gradually sold off its idle vessels until only SS William G. Mather remained, laid up in Toledo, Ohio where she had been since 1980. On December 10, 1987, Cleveland-Cliffs, Inc. donated the steamer SS William G. Mather to the Great Lakes Historical Society to be restored and preserved as a museum ship and floating maritime museum. After it was brought to Cleveland in October 1988 and funding was acquired from local foundations, corporations, and individuals, restoration began. Fire damage to SS William G. Mathers galley and after cabin spaces required a major restoration effort. All over the vessel, most of the work was supplied by volunteers who repaired, cleaned, chipped, painted, and polished brass in order to restore SS William G. Mathers former elegance. In October 1990, it was moved to its permanent berth at the East Ninth Street Pier on Cleveland's North Coast Harbor.

In September 1994 the Great Lakes Historical Society divested itself of the museum. Due, in large part, to a groundswell of local support to keep the Mather in Cleveland, the Harbor Heritage Society was created to negotiate a new lease agreement with the city. Incorporated in June 1995, Harbor Heritage formally acquired SS William G. Mather on July 22, 1995, and in 1996 continued to oversee William G. Mathers ongoing restoration, promotion, and development as a historic vessel. After ten years of negotiations, the City of Cleveland, represented by Mayor Jane L. Campbell signed a 40-year lease on June 15, 2003, allowing William G. Mather to stay at its East 9th Street berth.

On July 30, 1995 the steamship SS William G. Mather was dedicated as an American Society of Mechanical Engineers National Historic Mechanical Engineering Landmark for its 1954 installation of a single marine boiler and steam turbine engine, its 1964 installation of the Bailey 760 Boiler Control System and American Shipbuilding AmThrust dual propeller bow thruster—all firsts for U.S.-flagged Great Lakes vessels. It had a sister ship of the same class, SS Joseph H. Frantz, which was later converted to diesel, and was scrapped in 2005 after 80 years of continuous use.

Current location
On September 24, 2005, the museum was moved from the East Ninth Street Pier to Dock 32, just west of the East Ninth Street Pier, closer to the Great Lakes Science Center and the Rock and Roll Hall of Fame.

In October 2006, SS William G. Mather was acquired by the Great Lakes Science Center. Today, the ship is a focal point for interpreting the relationship between technology, history, commerce, and the environment.

See also
 William Gwinn Mather
 
 SS Col. James M. Schoonmaker The Mather's sister ship at one time, now a museum ship in Toledo, Ohio

Notes

References

External links
 
 The Steamship William G. Mather Museum - Great Lakes Science Center
 Brief History of the Mather at MHSD
 HNSA Ship Page: SS William G. Mather
 Mather history and photos

 

Great Lakes freighters
William G. Mather
Museums in Cleveland
1925 ships
Downtown Cleveland
Ships built in Ecorse, Michigan
Ships on the National Register of Historic Places in Ohio
National Register of Historic Places in Cleveland, Ohio
National Register of Historic Places in Cuyahoga County, Ohio
History of Cleveland
Cleveland
Lake Erie